Portals of Grace is the first solo release from Azam Ali. Prior to this album, she had released music with the group VAS.

Track listing
 Lasse Pour Quoi      (Anon. early 14th century, Middle French) - 6:21
 La Serena            (Sephardic, Judeo-Spanish) - 4:31
 Breton Medley        (instrumental, Brittany) - 3:57
 O Felix (Anima)      (12th century, Latin) - 5:18
 Ben Pode Santa Maria (13th century, Galician-Portuguese) - 3:08
 O Quanta Qualia      (12th century, Latin) - 3:59
 Sackpipslät          (instrumental, Sweden) - 2:40
 Ai Ondas             (Early 14th century, Galician-Portuguese) - 5:12
 A Chantar M'er       (Late 12th century, Old French) - 6:31
 Inna-I-Malak         (Byzantine, Arabic) - 5:23
 El Rey De Francia    (Sephardic, Judeo-Spanish) - 4:31

2002 albums
Narada Productions albums
Azam Ali albums